Clipper Magazine Stadium is a baseball park located in Lancaster, Pennsylvania, in the Northwest Corridor neighborhood. It is the home of the Lancaster Barnstormers, the city's Atlantic League of Professional Baseball (ALPB) franchise. It hosted its first regular-season baseball game on May 11, 2005, with the Barnstormers losing to the Atlantic City Surf, 4–3. The ballpark also serves as the corporate headquarters for the Atlantic League and seats 6,000 people.

The ballpark features a natural grass-and-dirt playing field. Its many food stands serve Pennsylvania Dutch and Philadelphia cuisine such as whoopie pies, cheesesteaks, hoagies, Tastykakes, soft pretzels from local bakeries and the Philly Pretzel Factory, barbecue from the four-time state champion Hess's BBQ, hot dogs from Kunzler & Company, beer from the Lancaster Brewing Company and Yuengling, ice cream and tea from Turkey Hill, salty treats from Utz and Snyder's of Hanover, and confections from nearby Hershey's. Clipper Magazine Stadium lies in the Northwest Corridor of Lancaster city, which includes Franklin & Marshall College and Penn Medicine Lancaster General Health. In October 2008, the venue hosted vice-presidential nominee Sarah Palin during the 2008 U.S. presidential election.

About 104,000 fans on BallparkDigest.com, a website by August Publications, ranked Clipper Magazine Stadium the "2020 Best of the Ballparks" out of all independent U.S. and Canadian baseball parks by a margin of 86 to 14 percent over the next runner-up, U.S. Steel Yard in Gary, Indiana. Clipper Magazine Stadium also won the 2021 "Best of the Ballparks MLB Partner Leagues" over runner-up, Franklin Field in suburban Milwaukee. The Atlantic League awarded Clipper Magazine Stadium the "Ballpark of the Year" following the end of its 2013 regular season, commemorating the Barnstormers staff for their excellence in groundskeeping and operations.

Clipper Magazine, a local periodical company, purchased the naming rights for $2.5 million over ten years beginning in 2006. They extended this agreement in 2013 through the 2019 season.

History 
Forty-four years before the opening of Clipper Magazine Stadium and the Lancaster Barnstormers' inaugural season, the Lancaster Red Roses entertained baseball enthusiasts for 20 years at Stumpf Field. Efforts for a new stadium and a new team began in 1987, and what was a long sixteen-year battle finally paid off with an announcement in 2003. The Commonwealth of Pennsylvania agreed to fund roughly half of the cost with Opening Day Partners and the city of Lancaster covered the remainder. The original plan in 2001 called for a proposed, $20-million ballpark to be constructed on the Diseley Farm site, across from Long's Park in Manheim Township. However, those plans were cancelled because of residential concerns about traffic and political concerns about the use of eminent domain and rezoning.  After this plan was terminated, most Lancaster County politicians preferred a downtown ballpark for the purpose of urban renewal. The Lancaster County Redevelopment Authority settled on an industrial site on the corner of North Prince and Frederick streets, where a company called Ace Rents existed. Initially, Ace Rents stalled the process, but quickly came to an agreement as they did not want to cause delay. The groundbreaking ceremony was held on April 28, 2004, and Clipper Magazine Stadium was finished just before it opened on May 11, 2005.

With its brick façade and steel beams, the architecture of Clipper Magazine Stadium alludes to its industrial surroundings. Located in the Northwest Corridor, the ballpark faces many downtown factories and spans a former rail yard.  Coincidentally, this section of Lancaster city (between North Mary and North Charlotte Streets, south of the Harrisburg Pike) was historically known as the "base ball ground" circa 1886.

Atlantic League All-Star Games

On July 12, 2007, the Lancaster Barnstormers hosted the Atlantic League's tenth-anniversary All-Star Game at Clipper Magazine Stadium. A crowd of 7,361 watched the opposing North Division won, 8-6. Lancaster players Jeremy Todd and Dominick Ambrosini both hit home-runs, but it was not enough to put their South Division team ahead.

Ballpark attractions

Clipper Magazine Stadium includes 6,000 green, chair-back seats in two levels divided by an open, 360-degree concourse. It also features other seating options such as luxury suites with professional catering, lawn seating that expands the ballpark's seating capacity to 7,500, and bleachers along the left-field wall. Additionally, the venue includes a Kid's Park with a birthday zone, a carousel, jungle gyms, a rock climbing wall, and various inflatables. Cylo's Clubhouse allows for youth to interact with the Barnstormers' bovine mascot, Cylo. Behind Section 13, the stadium features the Little Sluggers Dugout, an enclosed area for nursing mothers with a toddler play area and a television. The local Subaru dealer sponsors an outdoor area complete with Bocce Ball, corn-hole, a life-size Jenga, shuffleboard, ping pong, giant checkers, and a dog kissing booth, and a barbershop corner. The area also features the Broken Bat Craft Beer Deck, which features a wide variety of Central Pennsylvania craft beer choices. The Inside Corner Team Store located at the home-plate entrance features team apparel and souvenirs; it remains open throughout the year.

A mural honors Lancaster's professional baseball history, especially Richard M. Scott, the former mayor (1974–1979) who initiated the civic effort toward building Clipper Magazine Stadium.

Before the 2013 Atlantic League season, the Barnstormers made a series of improvements to Clipper Magazine Stadium. The first of these was a new playground for children along the third-base line featuring a foam-based protective floor. Other improvements included a renovated picnic area with new tents and a deck comprising synthetic materials instead of wood, a new right-field wall, landscaping beyond the outfield, and computerized irrigation controls.

Silverball Museum Arcade

The Lancaster Barnstormers added the Silverball Museum Arcade in time for the 2011 Atlantic League season.  It is a coin-free attraction that includes nostalgic arcade games from the 1930s to some of the video games played in the present.  Each machine possesses a description of its history and inspiration.  The Silverball Museum Arcade also has televisions and multimedia detailing everything pinball.

Stitches Sculpture

In late 2012, an artist named Derek Parker installed his baseball stitches sculpture along Clipper Magazine Stadium's main walkway on North Prince Street. It symbolically links the ballpark to Lancaster city. As the sixth Poetry Paths project completed by Franklin & Marshall College's Writer's House, the stitches also tie professional baseball and the arts. It includes the Le Hinton poem called "Our Ballpark" and is part of a $250,000 initiative by the Lancaster County Community Foundation to add art and poetry into Lancaster city's urban environment.

Special events

Countdown Lancaster
On New Year's Eve 2010, Clipper Magazine Stadium hosted its first celebration, "Countdown Lancaster".  The event was coordinated with a concert, fireworks, and the Red Rose drop at nearby Binns Park.

Ice Park at Clipper Magazine Stadium
Clipper Magazine Stadium is converted to an outdoor public ice-skating rink during the winter months so the Lancaster community may enjoy the ballpark in the off-season. Using state-of-the art equipment, the right field segment of the ballpark is converted to an ice skating rink measuring 135 feet by 85 feet with skate rental available; the concessions serve ballpark fare as well as soup, coffee, and hot chocolate.  In 2010, a 26-foot Ice Slide attraction by Avalanche Express was added to the Ice Park.

LeSean McCoy Celebrity Softball Game

In 2012, the Barnstormers held its first annual celebrity softball game, which was hosted by LeSean McCoy, an All-Pro running back on the Philadelphia Eagles and Harrisburg native. The contest pits the Eagles against professional football players from other teams in the National Football League. The 2012 Eagles roster featured Brent Celek, Hugh Douglas, DeSean Jackson, Jeremy Maclin, Dominique Rodgers-Cromartie, Torrey Smith, Michael Vick, and Brian Westbrook. Their opponents included Victor Cruz of the New York Giants, Devin Hester of the Chicago Bears, Cam Newton of the Carolina Panthers, Hakeem Nicks of the New York Giants, Ray Rice of the Baltimore Ravens, and Mike Wallace of the Pittsburgh Steelers.

Any proceeds collected for the LeSean McCoy Celebrity Softball Game are directed to the LeSean McCoy Foundation, a 501(c)(3) organization that serves to raise funds and awareness for amyotrophic lateral sclerosis. LeSean McCoy is motivated by his grandmother's death due to ALS. Additionally, the Foundation also provides for the underprivileged in Central Pennsylvania and Philadelphia. Some of the money collected from the 2012 game provided Christmas toys to the Boys and Girls Club and the Salvation Army, sports gear to the Police Athletic League, a professional football game and a winter vacation for families affected by ALS, winter coats and backpacks containing necessary school supplies for impoverished children, and winter coats for a women's and children's shelter in Philadelphia.

Concerts
Clipper Magazine Stadium has hosted various concerts, including rock musicians Bob Dylan, Bryan Adams, Def Leppard, Jefferson Starship, Lynyrd Skynyrd, and Peter Frampton; country music artists Clint Black, Dwight Yoakam, and Willie Nelson; and smooth jazz instrumentalist Kenny G.

Soccer
On July 16, 2009, Clipper Magazine Stadium hosted an exhibition match between the Harrisburg City Islanders and Crystal Palace F.C., a Premier League team based in London, England. The ballpark's infield was covered with grass sod in accordance with FIFA regulations. Additionally, local soccer clubs scheduled training sessions to maximize use of the temporary soccer pitch.

In August 2015, the venue hosted two more professional soccer matches. The first one featured the Harrisburg City Islanders versus FC Montreal, both members of the United Soccer League. The second game included the Philadelphia Union, a Major League Soccer club, versus Harrisburg. For the 2016 USL season, the City Islanders played five of their home games at Clipper Magazine Stadium. The other ten were played at their regular home, FNB Field on Harrisburg's City Island.

References

External links
 Clipper Magazine Stadium

Baseball venues in Pennsylvania
Lancaster Barnstormers
Buildings and structures in Lancaster, Pennsylvania
Sports in Lancaster, Pennsylvania
Minor league baseball venues
Atlantic League of Professional Baseball ballparks
Tourist attractions in Lancaster, Pennsylvania
Soccer venues in Pennsylvania
2005 establishments in Pennsylvania
Sports venues completed in 2005